Sage sparrow was the name of a species of sparrow that has since been reclassified as two species:

 Sagebrush sparrow, Artemisiospiza nevadensis
 Bell's sparrow, Artemisiospiza belli

Birds by common name